This is a list of episodes for the television series M Squad.

Series overview

Episodes

Season 1 (1957–58)

Season 2 (1958–59)

Season 3 (1959–60)

References

External links
 
 

M Squad